The National Harmony Party (Latvian: Tautas Saskaņas partija, TSP) was a political party in Latvia.

The party identified with social democracy. It supported further liberalisation of Latvian nationality law by granting citizenship to non-citizens who had lived in Latvia for at least 10 years. (The present law only allows Soviet-era migrants to apply for citizenship through a process of naturalization). It also supported expanding education in minority languages, particularly Russian.

History 
The roots of the TSP lay within the moderate wing of Popular Front of Latvia, the Latvian independence movement of the late 1980s and early 1990s. Its leader, Jānis Jurkāns, was the first Minister of Foreign Affairs of newly re-independent Latvia, from 1990 to 1992 when he had to leave the government for his stance on relations with Russia. Together with other activists, Jurkāns founded the Harmony for Latvia (Saskaņa Latvijai - Atdzimšana Tautsaimniecībai) alliance, which won 13 seats in the 1993 parliamentary election. The alliance split in 1994, with the free-market liberal wing becoming the Political Union of Economists and the social-democratic wing becoming the TSP. Jurkāns served as leader from then until 2005, when he resigned. The party's last Chairman was Jānis Urbanovičs.

From its foundation, the party was popular with ethnic Russian voters for its moderate views on the citizenship issue and official languages. Unlike other parties popular with Russians, it also had a considerable number of ethnic Latvians in its leadership and was an attempt to bridge the ethnic divide in Latvian politics. The TSP won 6 seats at the 1995 parliamentary election. In 1998, it allied with two other predominantly Russian parties, the Latvian Socialist Party and Equal Rights, both of which held more radical pro-Russian positions. This step seriously damaged the reputation of the TSP amongst ethnic Latvians. The three parties founded the For Human Rights in United Latvia alliance. At the 2002 parliamentary election, the alliance won 18.9% at the popular vote and 25 seats. In 2003, the TSP left the alliance. It won no seats at the 2004 European Parliament election, and in 2005 lost its representation on Riga City Council.

In 2005, the party created the electoral alliance Harmony Centre, containing, amongst other parties, the Latvian Socialist Party, one of its former partners in For Human Rights in United Latvia. Harmony Centre won 17 seats in the 2006 parliamentary election.  The TSP formed the basis of the Harmony party which was created on 10 February 2010.

Election results

Legislative elections

European Parliament elections

References 

 

Defunct political parties in Latvia
Political parties disestablished in 2010
2010 disestablishments in Latvia
Russian political parties in Latvia
Social democratic parties in Latvia